Isotogastrura is a genus of springtails in the family Isotogastruridae, the only genus of the family. There are at least 10 described species in Isotogastrura.

Species
These species belong to the genus Isotogastrura:
 Isotogastrura ahuizotli Palacios-Vargas & Thibaud, 1998
 Isotogastrura arenicola Thibaud & Najt, 1992
 Isotogastrura atuberculata Palacios-Vargas & Thibaud, 2001
 Isotogastrura coronata Fjellberg, 1995
 Isotogastrura litoralis Thibaud & Weiner, 1997
 Isotogastrura madagascariensis Thibaud, 2008
 Isotogastrura mucrospatulata Palacios-Vargas, de Lima, & Zeppelini, 2013
 Isotogastrura praiana da Silveira, de Mendonça, & Da-Silva, 2014
 Isotogastrura trichaetosa Potapov, Bu, & Gao, 2011
 Isotogastrura veracruzana Palacios-Vargas & Thibaud, 1998

References

Further reading

 

Collembola